Simon K. King is an Indian film composer who predominantly composes music for Tamil and Telugu films. He made his debut with Sasi's Ainthu Ainthu Ainthu (2013) and is well known for the song "Yavvana" from the film Sathya, and for background score in Kolaigaran.

Career
Simon K.King started his music career as a keyboard programmer while he was pursuing his graduation in electrical engineering. He then continued to work on developing his interests in composing and arranging music. From there he started composing jingles where he has notably worked on more than 300 jingles for various brands. Simultaneously he worked as a freelance music producer for many music directors in Tamil, Hindi, Telugu, Kannada and Malayalam film industries.

Discography

Television

References

External links
 

Living people
21st-century classical composers
Tamil film score composers
Tamil musicians
1986 births
Telugu film score composers